A swan neck flask, also known as a gooseneck flask, is a round-bottom flask with a narrow s-shaped tube as its opening to reduce contact between the inner contents and external environment. The motion of air through the tube is slowed and aerosolized bacteria or other particles in the air tend to become trapped by moisture on the tube's inner surfaces. The contents of the flask thus remain free of microbes, a property showcased by French microbiologist Louis Pasteur in 19th century experiments used to support germ theory as the cause of fermentation over spontaneous generation from bad air (miasma).

See also
 Gooseneck (piping)

References

Laboratory glassware